You Will Be My Wife (French: Vous serez ma femme) is a 1932 German comedy film directed by Carl Boese, Serge de Poligny and Heinz Hille and starring Alice Field, Roger Tréville and Lucien Baroux. It is the French-language version of UFA's The Cheeky Devil.

The film's sets were designed by the art directors Willi Herrmann and Herbert Lippschitz.

Cast
Alice Field as Alice Ménard  
Roger Tréville as Le jeune homme 
Lucien Baroux as Gustave Ménard 
Lucien Callamand as Le portier  
Paulette Dubost as Annette  
Jane Pierson as La mère de Loulou  
Janine Ronceray as Loulou Gazelle  
Pierre Sergeol as Henri Latour

References

External links

Films of the Weimar Republic
German comedy films
1932 comedy films
Films based on works by Louis Verneuil
Films directed by Carl Boese
Films directed by Heinz Hille
UFA GmbH films
German multilingual films
German black-and-white films
1932 multilingual films
1930s German films